James Jenkins Dossen (c.1866 – August 17, 1924)) was a Liberian politician and jurist, serving as the 16th vice president of Liberia from 1906 to 1912 under President Arthur Barclay. He was elected president of the Liberia College in 1913, and associate judge of the Supreme Court of Liberia for 10 years, before holding the position of Chief Justice of the Supreme Court of Liberia for 13 years. The J.J. Dossen Memorial Hospital in Harper, Maryland County, one of the hospitals in south-eastern Liberia, is named after him.

References

Americo-Liberian people
1866 births
1924 deaths
Vice presidents of Liberia
Chief justices of Liberia
Presidents of the University of Liberia
People from Maryland County
True Whig Party politicians
20th-century Liberian politicians
20th-century Liberian judges